Dương Thanh Hào (born 23 June 1991) is a Vietnamese footballer who plays as a centre-back for V.League 1 club Bình Định.

Club career

Than Quang Ninh
After the 2016 season, Thanh Hào signed a 3-year deal with Than Quang Ninh.

References 

1991 births
Living people
Vietnamese footballers
Association football central defenders
V.League 1 players
Hanoi FC players
People from Bình Định province
Vietnam international footballers
Dong Thap FC players
Binh Dinh FC players